Leland Payson Bancroft (August 6, 1880 – February 27, 1951) was a Canadian politician. He was elected to the House of Commons of Canada in 1921 as a Member of the Progressive Party for the riding of Selkirk. He was defeated in 1925 as a Liberal-Progressive, but, won in 1926 and was defeated again in 1930. He died in Vancouver in 1951.

References

External links 
 

1880 births
1951 deaths
Liberal-Progressive MPs
Members of the House of Commons of Canada from Manitoba
Progressive Party of Canada MPs